Balandougou (also spelled Balandugu) is a town and sub-prefecture in the Kankan Prefecture in the Kankan Region of eastern Guinea. As of 2014 it had a population of 27,554 people.

References

Sub-prefectures of the Kankan Region